Kendriya Vidyalaya, Ottapalam is a school in Ottapalam, Kerala, India which offers education. Founded in 1986 with the support of Sri K. R. Narayanan, then member of parliament from Ottapalam. The school was started with less than 120 students in a rented premise at Kanniampuram.

In 1992, the School shifted to a  campus in Palappuram - where there was space for separate staff quarters, the school building, and 3 large playgrounds.

The then Vice President (and later the President of the Republic of India), K.R. Narayanan, had inaugurated the K.V. Ottapalam building in 1992. He and his security team of "Black-cats" arrived in a fleet of helicopters, which landed on the nearby NSS College Ground.

The vidyalaya has been selected as a Model Kendriya Vidyalaya in the year 2000–2001.

Campus
The school is situated in a picturesque campus in close proximity to the Bharathapuzha river, approximately 5 km from Ottapalam town. It has two main playgrounds. The building is of traditional Kerala style architecture, with a nadumuttam (courtyard) where the morning assembly is held. The school library has been moved to a new and bigger building.

Courses offered
The school offers the Science and Commerce streams, for the PlusOne and PlusTwo studies. The Science stream students can choose either Biology or Computer Science, as their core subject.

The alumni of the school are active in various parts of the world in a variety of jobs and functions. They maintain the KV Otp website for alumni.

List of principals
 Smt Shanta Devi
 Smt Sowdamini
 Late Sri KP Rabindran
 Sri V Jayabal
 Mr. N M Varadharajulu
 Shri.A P Vinodkumar  
 Dr. S Nalayini 
 Shri Rajendran K (current principal)

Notable alumni
Abhijith K

See also
 List of Kendriya Vidyalayas

official kv ottapalam website
Official website (Old)
Alumni website

References

Kendriya Vidyalayas in Kerala
Ottapalam
Schools in Palakkad district
1986 establishments in Kerala
Educational institutions established in 1986